Joost Schmidt (Wunstorf, 5 January 1893 - Nürnberg, 2 December 1948) was a German typographer, a teacher or master at the Bauhaus, and later a professor at the College of Visual Arts, Berlin. He was a visionary typographer and graphic designer who is best known for designing the famous poster for the 1923 Bauhaus Exhibition in Weimar, Germany.

Studies
Schmidt studied art at the Grand-Ducal Saxon Academy of Fine Art in Weimar, before becoming a student at the Bauhaus School from 1919–1925, training in the wood-carving workshop. He became the master student of Max Thedy and received his diploma in painting in the winter semester of 1913/1914.

Teaching
Joost Schmidt taught lettering at the school from 1925–1932; head of the sculpture workshop from 1928-1930. He was also head of the Advertising, Typography, Printing, and associated Photography department from 1928 to 1932. In the years of 1929-1930, he taught life and figure drawing classes for upper division work.

Family
Joost was one of three children, and endured a difficult upbringing. He pursued his work as a graphic designer despite much resistance from the Nazis. After receiving his diploma in 1914 in painting, he served in the military and was briefly a prisoner of war until he returned to his work in Germany in 1918. In 1925, he married the Bauhaus student Helene Nonne.

Gallery

References 

Academic staff of the Bauhaus
German typographers and type designers
1893 births
1948 deaths
People from Wunstorf